Steven H. Amick (May 13, 1947 – January 23, 2019) was an American politician who served in the Delaware House of Representatives from the 25th district from 1987 to 1995 and in the Delaware Senate from the 10th district from 1995 to 2009.

He died on January 23, 2019, in Wilmington, Delaware at age 71.

References

1947 births
2019 deaths
Republican Party members of the Delaware House of Representatives
Republican Party Delaware state senators